The Sharpless catalog is a list of 313 H II regions (emission nebulae) intended to be comprehensive north of declination −27°. (It does include some nebulae south of that declination as well.) The first edition was published in 1953 with 142 objects (Sh1), and the second and final version was published by US astronomer Stewart Sharpless in 1959 with 312 objects. Sharpless also includes some planetary nebulae and supernova remnants, in addition to H II regions.

In 1953 Stewart Sharpless joined the staff of the United States Naval Observatory Flagstaff Station, where he surveyed and cataloged H II regions of the Milky Way using the images from the Palomar Sky Survey. From this work Sharpless published his catalog of H II regions in two editions: the first in 1953, with 142 nebula; and the second and final edition in 1959, with 312 nebulae.

Sharpless coordinates are based on the star catalogs Bonner Durchmusterung (BD) and Cordoba Durchmusterung (CD), but the second release was adjusted to the 1900 epoch.

In the second release, some coordinates for southern hemisphere regions have an uncertainty over 1 minute of arc. This can make them difficult to find, so a revised catalog called BFS (Blitz, Fich and Stark) was released with 65 new regions and about 20 removals. Most of the removed items were the aforementioned nebula or remnants.

The 312 items in Sharpless sometimes overlap with the 110 Messier objects (M), 7,840 objects in the New General Catalogue (NGC), the Caldwell catalogue (itself a "best of" from other catalogues, with 109 items), and the RCW catalog. Contemporary catalogs were Gum and RCW, but they mainly covered the southern hemisphere.

Examples
Examples of second Sharpless (1958 version) catalog; click on image for image credit, most of which are either various amateur astronomers, the ESO, ESA, or NASA

See also 
 Gum Catalog
 RCW Catalog
 List of Star-Forming Regions in the Local Group

References

External links
Original catalog
Illustrated and annotated commentary
SIMBAD Sh2 listing
Sh2 images

Astronomical catalogues of nebulae
 
H II regions
1953 documents
1953 in science